54598 Bienor  is a centaur that grazes the orbit of Uranus. It is named after the mythological centaur Bienor. Its closest approach to the Sun (perihelion) is 13.2 AU. , Bienor is 14.2 AU from the Sun and will reach perihelion in January 2028.

See also 
 
 Minor planet
 Solar System

References

External links 
 
 
 1953 precovery image by the Palomar Observatory Sky Survey (Bienor is the object at the centre).

Centaurs (small Solar System bodies)
054598
Named minor planets
054598
20000827